Yo... el aventurero is a 1959 Mexican ranchera-comedy film directed by Jaime Salvador and starring Antonio Aguilar, Rosa de Castilla, Ángel Infante, Amalia Mendoza, Andrés Soler, and Domingo Soler. The film was shot in Mexiscope, a lens similar to CinemaScope, and it one of the rare color films of the late 1950s.

Cast
Antonio Aguilar as Antonio Ardabín
Rosa de Castilla as Gloria Cisneros
Ángel Infante as Gregorio Carriles
Amalia Mendoza as Amalia 
Andrés Soler as Guadalupe Cisneros
Domingo Soler as Manuel Ardabín
Agustín Isunza as Moncho		
Joaquín García Vargas as Nacho		
Armando Soto La Marina as Nicho		
Paco Michel as Lencho		
Dolores Tinoco as Petra
Eduardo Pérez as Pascual		
Roberto Meyer as Comandante
José Luis Fernández as José Luis	
Guillermo Calles as Amalia's confidant

External links

Mexican comedy films
Films directed by Jaime Salvador
1950s Mexican films